Claude Lacaze (born Pontacq, 5 March 1940) is a former French rugby union and league player. He played rugby union as a fullback.

Club career
Lacaze played for FC Lourdes, SC Angoulême and Racing Club de Nice.

International career
He had 33 caps for France, from 1961 to 1969, scoring 1 try, 13 conversions, 5 penalties and 5 drop goals, 59 points on aggregate.

He played in the Five Nations Championship at four competitions, being a winner three times, in 1962, 1967 and 1968, this time with a Grand Slam. He also participated in 1963, 1964 and 1966. He had 16 caps, scoring 1 try, 5 conversions, 2 penalties and 2 drop goals, 25 point on aggregate, during his presence at the competition.

Rugby League
He also played rugby league, although less successfully than his older brother, Perre Lacaze.

References

External links
Claude Lacaze International Statistics

1940 births
Living people
French rugby union players
France international rugby union players
French rugby league players
FC Lourdes players
Rugby union fullbacks
People from Béarn
Sportspeople from Pyrénées-Atlantiques